Boothite is a very rare, naturally occurring mineral containing hydrated copper sulfate: Cu(SO4)·7H2O. It was discovered in the Leona Heights region near Oakland, California before 1959.

References

Minerals
Copper compounds